Maxim Konstantinovich Beryozkin (born 12 October 2001), also known as  Maksim Berezkin, is a Russian ice hockey winger who plays for Lokomotiv Yaroslavl of the KHL.   He was drafted by the Edmonton Oilers in the 5th round of the 2020 NHL Entry Draft with the 138th overall pick.

References

External links

2001 births
Living people
Edmonton Oilers draft picks
Lokomotiv Yaroslavl players
People from Chita, Zabaykalsky Krai
Russian ice hockey left wingers
Sportspeople from Zabaykalsky Krai